Gabriel Alejandro Reyes Casas (born 21 September 1998) is a Mexican footballer who plays as a defender for Saltillo.

Reyes began playing club football with Celaya F.C. at age 15. He made his professional debut with the club in the Ascenso MX at age 19.

References

1998 births
Living people
Mexican footballers
Association football defenders
Club Celaya footballers
Ascenso MX players
Liga Premier de México players
People from Celaya
Footballers from Guanajuato